U.S. Route 250 (US 250) is a United States Numbered Highway that runs from Sandusky, Ohio, to Richmond, Virginia. Within the state of West Virginia, the route runs from the Ohio border in Wheeling to the Virginia border near Thornwood.

Route description
 U.S. 250's northern entrance into West Virginia is via the Military Order of the Purple Heart Bridge from Bridgeport, Ohio, onto Wheeling Island. It is briefly co-signed with U.S. Route 40. The route additionally co-signs with Interstate 70 and crosses the Ohio River on the Fort Henry Bridge in Wheeling, West Virginia. U.S. Route 250 then exits I-70 east of the Wheeling Tunnel and joins West Virginia Route 2 one mile (1.6 km) later.  In Moundsville, West Virginia, the route leaves WV 2 and departs toward Cameron, Mannington, and Fairmont. It intersects with its parent route, U.S. Route 50, two miles west of Grafton in Pruntytown and continues southward, co-signed with U.S. Route 119 for 12 miles. The route moves through Philippi, and finally through Elkins.  U.S. Route 250 intersects with U.S. Route 33 and U.S. Route 219 briefly in Elkins, which is the last major hub before U.S. Route 250 winds its way through the Appalachian Mountains to the Virginia border.

U.S. 250 in West Virginia includes the Philippi Covered Bridge at Philippi, the only covered bridge on the United States Numbered Highway System.

History
Originally, US 250 ran from Norwalk, Ohio to end at US 50 in Grafton, West Virginia. Today, it runs from Sandusky, Ohio to Richmond, Virginia, passing its original eastern terminus.

Major intersections

Philippi truck route 

U.S. Route 250 Truck follows Blue and Gray Expressway around the south and west sides of downtown Philippi, avoiding the covered bridge.

External links

50-2
 West Virginia
Transportation in Barbour County, West Virginia
Transportation in Marion County, West Virginia
Transportation in Marshall County, West Virginia
Transportation in Ohio County, West Virginia
Transportation in Pocahontas County, West Virginia
Transportation in Randolph County, West Virginia
Transportation in Taylor County, West Virginia
Transportation in Wetzel County, West Virginia